Evan Rees may refer to:

 Evan Rees (rugby) (1896-1978), Welsh rugby union and rugby league footballer who played in the 1910s
 Evan Rees (Dyfed) (1850–1923), Calvinistic Methodist minister, poet, and Archdruid of the National Eisteddfod of Wales
 Evan Rees (Australian footballer) (1923–2004), Australian rules football player for Footscray